Kim Lamarre (born 20 May 1988) is a Canadian freestyle skier. She won Canada's first ever bronze medal in the women's slopestyle skiing event at the 2014 Winter Olympics. Lamarre said of her surprise bronze that "This is surreal. I have no words to describe this feeling. I am so happy. I knew it was possible but I didn't put it as my main goal. I just wanted to make the finals and then land my run and see what happened." The medal came after compatriot and gold medal favourite Kaya Turski failed to qualify for the finals. Despite this Canada still managed two medals in the event after Dara Howell won the gold medal.

Personal life
Lamarre's grandmother, Ginette Seguin, represented Canada at the 1956 Winter Olympics and competed in alpine skiing. She was 18th in the slalom, 33rd in downhill and 36th in giant slalom.

References

External links

1988 births
Canadian female freestyle skiers
Living people
Skiers from Quebec City
Freestyle skiers at the 2014 Winter Olympics
Freestyle skiers at the 2018 Winter Olympics
Olympic freestyle skiers of Canada
Olympic bronze medalists for Canada
Medalists at the 2014 Winter Olympics
Olympic medalists in freestyle skiing
X Games athletes